Medium Rare is an American event creation and production company. It is known for creating joint venture live events and broadcasts with celebrities including Shaquille O’Neal, Rob Gronkowski, Daymond John and Guy Fieri. It is also known for working with Rob Gronkowski to produce the first NFT created by a professional athlete.

History 
Medium Rare was founded by Adam Richman and Joe Silberzweig in 2018. Prior to founding Medium Rare, Silberzweig and Richman worked for event and music festival companies such as Insomniac, Live Nation, Livestyle, ID&T, and Tomorrowland.

In 2018, Medium Rare collaborated with Shaquille O’Neal to create Shaq's festival - Shaq's Fun House, which featured carnival games, circus performers, and O’Neal performing as a celebrity DJ. The event also featured DJs such as Steve Aoki, A-Trak, Diplo, and Carnage. Medium Rare has produced each iteration of Shaq's Fun House from 2018 until the present.

Since 2019, Medium Rare has managed DJ Diesel (Shaquille O’Neal’s DJ act), and DJ Carnage.

In 2020, Medium Rare produced the first Black Entrepreneurs Day in association with Daymond John. A second one was produced in 2021.

In March 2021, Medium Rare and Gronkowski released several digital trading cards, featuring Gronkowski’s notable Super Bowl moments, as NFTs in 2021. They were the first NFTs created and offered by a professional athlete. Gronkowski’s NFTs set records at the time, generating approximately $2,000,000 USD and were showcased across major media outlets including CNBC, Forbes, and Saturday Night Live. In May 2021, Medium Rare and The Golden State Warriors created the first NFT offered by a professional sports team.

On February 11, 2022, Shaq's Fun House was held on the Superbowl weekend at Shrine Auditorium in Los Angeles with 5000 attendees. Performers included Lil Wayne and local businesses such as Pink’s Hot Dogs served food.

Productions

References 

American companies established in 2018
Mass media companies established in 2018
2018 establishments in California